These are the official results of the Men's 110 metres hurdles event at the 2001 IAAF World Championships in Edmonton, Canada. There were a total number of 41 participating athletes, with seven qualifying heats, three semi-finals and the final held on Thursday August 9, 2001 at 21:15h.

Medalists

Records

Final

Semi-final
Held on Wednesday 2001-08-08

Heats
Held on Tuesday 2001-08-07

References
 

H
Sprint hurdles at the World Athletics Championships